Edona Kryeziu (born 3 October 1995) is a Kosovar footballer who plays as a forward and has appeared for the Kosovo women's national team.

Career
Kryeziu has been capped for the Kosovo national team, appearing for the team during the 2019 FIFA Women's World Cup qualifying cycle.

See also
List of Kosovo women's international footballers

References

External links
 
 
 

1995 births
Living people
Kosovan women's footballers
Kosovo women's international footballers
Women's association football forwards
KFF Mitrovica players